This is a list of musical artists that are of South Korean nationality. They may not necessarily be of full Korean ancestry, sing in Korean language, or reside in South Korea.

0-9

A

B

C

D

E

F

G

H

I

J

K 

 KYUL

L

M

N

O

P

R

S

T

U

V

W

X

Y

Z

See also
 List of North Korean musicians
 Lists of musicians
 Culture of South Korea
 Music of Korea
 List of individual K-pop artists

References

 
South Korean